Compact cardinal may refer to:

 Weakly compact cardinal
 Subcompact cardinal
 Supercompact cardinal
 Strongly compact cardinal